Ijaz Ahmed Chaudhry may refer to:

 Ijaz Ahmed Chaudhry (judge, born 1945)
 Ijaz Ahmed Chaudhry (judge, born 1950)
 Ejaz Chaudhary, politician, born 1956
 Muhammad Ijaz Ahmed Chaudhary, politician